Santa Clara Valley Medical Center, commonly known as Valley Medical Center or simply Valley Medical, is a prominent 731-bed public tertiary, teaching, and research hospital in San Jose, California. Located in the Fruitdale neighborhood of West San Jose, Valley Medical Center is the anchor facility of the Santa Clara County Health System, serving Santa Clara County. Valley Medical is home to numerous innovative research and care centers, such as the Rehabilitation Trauma Center, the only federally-designated spinal cord injury center in Northern California.

History

The campus and hospital were founded at its present location in 1876 by Dr. Benjamin Cory, the Director of Public Health. Founded as the County Hospital, it was the first organized hospital in the San Francisco Bay Area. The current campus continues to sit at the very same spot where the original hospital was constructed in the 19th century. This has led to issues with construction on site with the February 2012 unearthing of an 1870-1920s pauper's grave site.

Trauma and emergency care

Santa Clara Valley Medical Center is one of five adult level one trauma centers in Northern California, along with Stanford University Medical Center in northwestern Santa Clara County, San Francisco General Hospital in San Francisco, Highland Hospital (Alameda County) in Oakland, and UC Davis Medical Center in Sacramento. It also is one of four pediatric level I trauma centers in Northern California. It operates the only federally designated spinal cord injury center in Northern California, the Rehabilitation Trauma Center, along with the only traumatic brain injury center for the treatment and rehabilitation of patients. It operates one of four burn centers in Northern California. It is the only trauma center in California to co-locate all five of these services on one campus.

Santa Clara Valley Medical Center operates numerous critical care units including the highest level neonatal intensive care unit. The medical center also is licensed for cardiovascular surgery and cardiac catheterization. It is designated a primary stroke treatment center by the Joint Commission on Accreditation of Health Organizations. In addition, the Medical Center operates onsite outpatient clinics and satellite clinics in Central San Jose, East San Jose, South San Jose, as well as the suburbs of Sunnyvale, Gilroy, and Milpitas.

Residencies

Residency programs operated by Santa Clara Valley Medical Center include internal medicine, obstetrics/gynecology, radiology, and pharmacy. Residents in anesthesiology, dermatology, emergency medicine, general surgery, neurology, ophthalmology, orthopedic surgery, pediatrics, physical medicine & rehabilitation, plastic surgery, radiation oncology, and urology from Stanford Medical School all rotate through Santa Clara Valley Medical Center. 

Residents in infectious diseases from the Kaiser Permanente Medical Program rotate through Santa Clara Valley Medical Center, as do members of the occupational medicine program from UC San Francisco.

Hospital rating data

The HealthGrades website contains the clinical quality data for Santa Clara Valley Medical Center, as of 2018. For this rating section clinical quality rating data, patient safety ratings and patient experience ratings are presented.

For inpatient conditions and procedures, there are three possible ratings: worse than expected, as expected, better than expected.  For this hospital the data for this category is:
Worse than expected - 4
As expected - 12
Better than expected - 5

For patient safety ratings the same three possible ratings are used. For this hospital they are"
Worse than expected - 0
As expected - 12
Better than expected - 1

Percentage of patients rating this hospital as a 9 or 10 - 62%
Percentage of patients who on average rank hospitals as a 9 or 10 - 69%

References

External links

This hospital in the CA Healthcare Atlas A project by OSHPD
 California EMS trauma center list and level designations (.PDF format)
 American College of Surgeons list of ACS verified California trauma centers and level designations

County hospitals in California
Hospitals in Santa Clara County, California
Teaching hospitals in California
Buildings and structures in San Jose, California
Government of Santa Clara County, California
Organizations based in Santa Clara County, California
Hospital buildings completed in 1876
Hospitals established in 1876
1876 establishments in California
Trauma centers